Starosta (Czech/Slovak feminine: Starostová) is a Czech, Polish, and Slovak surname. Notable people with this surname include:
 Ben Starosta (born 1987), Polish-English footballer
 Jaroslav Starosta (born 1937), Czech rower
 Jiří Starosta (1923–2012), Czech football manager
 Marysia Starosta (born 1981), Polish singer
 Monika Starosta (born 1972), Polish tennis player
 Ondřej Starosta (born 1979), Czech basketball player
 Sławomir Starosta (born 1965), Polish LGBT activist
 Tomáš Starosta (born 1981), Slovak ice hockey player
 Waldemar Starosta (born 1961), Polish politician

See also
 

Czech-language surnames
Polish-language surnames
Slovak-language surnames